"My Heart Skips a Beat" is a 1964 single written and performed by Buck Owens.

Background
The single was Owens's third number one on the U.S. country singles chart. "My Heart Skips a Beat" spent seven non-consecutive weeks at the top with a total of twenty-six weeks on the chart. The B-side, "Together Again", also hit number one on the country chart both replacing and being replaced by "My Heart Skips a Beat" from the top spot.

Chart performance

References

1964 singles
Buck Owens songs
Billboard Hot Country Songs number-one singles of the year
Songs written by Buck Owens
Song recordings produced by Ken Nelson (American record producer)
Capitol Records singles
1964 songs